A Made in USA mark is a country of origin label affixed to homegrown, American-made products that indicates the product is "all or virtually all" domestically produced, manufactured and assembled in the United States of America. The label is regulated by the Federal Trade Commission (FTC).

In general, goods imported into the United States must have a country of origin label unless excepted, but goods manufactured in the United States can be sold with no origin label unless explicitly required. U.S.-made goods that must bear an origin label include automobiles, textiles, wool, and fur products. Any voluntary claims about the amount of U.S. content in other products must comply with the FTC's Made in USA policy.

A Made in USA claim can be expressed (for example, "American-made") or implied. In identifying implied claims, the Commission focuses on the overall impression of the advertising, label, or promotional material. Depending on the context, U.S. symbols or geographic references (for example, U.S. flags, outlines of U.S. maps, or references to U.S. locations of headquarters or factories) may convey a claim of U.S. origin either by themselves or in conjunction with other phrases or images.

In May 1997, the FTC published its proposal that the requirement be stated as:

However, this was just a proposal and never became part of the final guidelines published in the Federal Register in 1997.

Assembled in USA 
A product that includes foreign components may be called "Assembled in USA" without qualification when its principal assembly takes place in the U.S. and the assembly is substantial. For the "assembly" claim to be valid, the product's "last substantial transformation" also should have occurred in the United States. A "screwdriver" assembly in the U.S. of foreign components into a final product at the end of the manufacturing process does not usually qualify for the "Assembled in USA" claim.

Regulation 

Country of origin labels are required on textiles, wools, furs, automobiles, most foods, and many other imports.

Customs fraud 
Examples of fraudulent practices involving imports include removing a required foreign origin label before the product is even delivered to the ultimate purchaser (with or without the improper substitution of a Made in USA label) and failing to label a product with the required country of origin.

Urban myth
A rumour spread that products made in a town named "Usa, Ōita" located in Ōita Prefecture, Japan and exported to the US in the 1960s carried the label MADE IN USA, JAPAN, to create the appearance that the product was made in the US.  It is, however, a myth that Japan renamed the town "Usa" following World War II so that goods exported from Japan could be labeled as such.  The town has existed from the 8th century (see Usa Jingū), predating the existence of the "United States of America" (first used in the 1776 United States Declaration of Independence) by more than a millennium, and is not a major manufacturing center; furthermore, the United States Customs Service would probably have recognized such labeling, had it occurred, as fraudulent and thus would have prohibited goods so labeled from being imported into the United States.

Significance 
Many manufacturers use the Made in the U.S.A. label as a selling point with varying degrees of success. This tag is associated with marketing and operational benefits, such as more appeal to certain buyers and lower shipping costs. When an American consumer sees a product is made in the U.S., they may perceive it as higher quality than a Chinese-made version, for example. The decision where to produce is based on many factors, not simply direct product costs. Marketing and operations are both affected greatly by producing domestically.

Marketing significance 
Many companies highlight the fact a product is made in the U.S. with their branding and marketing campaigns, benefitting from the huge marketing potential, often affecting the success of a product. Country of origin is a typical heuristic used when purchasing, playing a significant role in consumer perception and evaluation since some consumers believe domestic products offer higher value and less risk.

Automotive 
For years American car brands have used this as a differentiating point. Supporting companies such as Ford was thought of as patriotic. Twenty-eight percent of Americans have said they would only buy American vehicles. There was a large push from domestic automakers after foreign competition entered the market in the 1980s. Ford placed ads to all Americans highlighting that they made quality cars. Chrysler also needed to reclaim market share from foreign competitors. They created commercials about American cars that were made by Americans with American parts. In recent years, the trend has changed as Cars.com's 2016 American-Made Index for that year showed that many Hondas and Toyotas are among the top "American-made" automobiles.

Apparel 

Due to concerns about the exploitation of non-American workers in sweatshops, products bearing a Made in the USA label can appeal to American consumers seeking high-quality products produced domestically under American labor and environmental laws. Until it shut down brick and mortar stores in 2017, American Apparel, which had been producing in Los Angeles since 1989, was the largest garment manufacturer in North America. The company's CEO was committed to social responsibility, and offered factory workers careers with benefits and pay significantly higher than that of their overseas counterparts. When they shuttered, 2,400 employees were left unemployed. After being purchased by Gildan Activewear, American Apparel returned as an online-only retailer with most of its apparel sourced from factories in Central America, primarily Honduras and Nicaragua. Los Angeles Apparel, the new manufacturer, designer and distributor led by Dov Charney, the former CEO of American Apparel, hired back 350, 200 employees were hired by Broncs Inc., and Zack Hurley, CEO of Indie Source committed to hiring "at least a few dozen."

Food 
After worker protests and bribery investigations, Walmart, the largest grocery store in the world, has pledged to source $50 billion in products from the US over the next ten years. Companies such as Tropicana sold their orange juice as being 100% native to Florida. In the late 2000s decade, they started to mix oranges from Brazil, and Florida's Natural saw this as an opportunity to place "Made in the USA" on their cartons. After Tropicana returned to only using Florida oranges several years later, Florida's Natural updated their ads saying "All Florida. Never imported. Who can say that?"

Operational significance 
Companies that make products in the US also see benefits in their supply chain. Not all benefits are directly seen in cash flows immediately. Aspects like communication are simply improved, which may have effects that are not seen in the short run. The trend towards overseas factories has resulted in complications for companies of all sizes, ranging from quality to timeline issues.

Financial 
Some direct costs are decreased as a result of using domestic factories. Shipping is simpler and faster when there is no need to deal with customs. US factories offer more flexible production runs, which can be appealing to new companies or new products. These offer prices and quantities closer to what companies require. Research shows that reduced tariff rates are reflected immediately in lower clothing prices. This suggests that the price of an imported good directly includes the tariff paid to import it. By producing in the US, this price increase is avoided.

Non-financial 
Companies also benefit from non-direct cost ways of making in the US.  The US has the most productive workforce. Costs are higher for these factories but the workers are more effective than their abroad counterparts. China historically was a cheap place to manufacture. This led to the thriving apparel factories. As currency appreciates, and wages rise people are moving to low-cost areas in south-east Asia, and also coming back to the US. China's prices are rising and time to market is becoming increasingly important. Communication is difficult as well for companies that produce in areas where another language is spoken. The general manager of a Haier plant in Camden, South Carolina Bernie Tymkiw has been quoted saying, “We just don't have the brainstorming ability because of language.” The cultural disconnect can prove to be a significant barrier with global companies.

Supply chains are more agile using local suppliers. There is a greater control over orders. High-end designers like being very close to their factories, as they have full control of the product quality that is leaving the assembly line. This is necessary to keep their high standards. One can visit their factory as often as necessary. This plays an important role in auditing the production process. An online article about the luxury apparel maker company Everlane led to over 2,000 shirts sales in a single day. A shirt restock from China may have taken three months, whereas they were able to do it in under one month. Being closer to the factory can aid in shipping costs and time.

Examples 
According to the FTC, Made in USA means that “all or virtually all” the product has been made in the United States of America. The product should contain only negligible foreign content. The FTC Enforcement Policy Statement on U.S. Origin Claims says there is no single "bright line" determining what "all or substantially all" means. The minimum requirement is that the final assembly or processing of the product must take place within the United States. Examples are given on the FTC site; a barbecue grill made of components made in the US with the exception of the knobs may be called "Made in USA" while a garden tool with an imported motor may not.

Controversial use of label
Goods produced in American Samoa (a United States territory) are entitled to attach a "Made in USA" label, as this is an insular area of the United States. This area has until recently had few of the labor and safety protections afforded United States workers, and there have been a number of cases of sweatshop operators exploiting labor forces imported from South and East Asia. The Northern Mariana Islands is another U.S. possession in the Pacific that was exempted from certain U.S. wage and immigration laws until 2007, where the use of the "Made in USA" label was likewise controversial. The label is controversial also since all U.S. insular areas, except Puerto Rico, operate under a customs territory separate from the U.S., making their products technically imports when sold in the United States proper.

FTC enforcement 
In March 2020, the FTC announced a settlement with Williams-Sonoma, Inc. over false advertising claims where Goldtouch Bakeware products, Rejuvenation-branded products, and Pottery Barn Teen and Pottery Barn Kids-branded upholstered furniture products were falsely advertised as Made in the USA. As part of the settlement with the FTC, Williams-Sonoma, Inc. agreed to stop making false, misleading, or unsubstantiated ‘Made in the USA’ claims and is required to pay $1 million to the FTC.

In June 2016, the FTC ordered Shinola Detroit to stop using "Where American is Made" as a slogan as "100% of the cost of materials used to make certain watches is attributable to imported materials." Today, the Ronda movements are made in Bangkok, Thailand. The dials, hands, cases, crystals, and buckles are manufactured in Guangdong, China.

See also
 American nationalism
 Buy American Act
 Country of origin
 Saipan's Federal Regulation Exemptions
 Swiss Made
 Manufacturing in the United States
 Made in America (disambiguation)
 Made in America Festival

References

External links

 Complying with the Made In the USA Standard, FTC

Industry in the United States
USA
American nationalism
American inventions